Richard A.F. Clark is a dermatologist and biomedical engineer currently at the State University of New York at Stony Brook in Stony Brook, New York. Clark co-edited, with Peter M. Henson, of The Molecular and Cellular Biology of Wound Repair (Plenum Press, 1988) and is a contributor to wound repair, dermatology, and angiogenesis research. In addition, he is also a member of the board of directors of the Society for Investigative Dermatology.

Clark graduated from the Massachusetts Institute of Technology and has worked at the Massachusetts General Hospital. He was previously professor at Harvard University. He is now a professor at State University of New York at Stony Brook.

References

American dermatologists
Massachusetts Institute of Technology alumni
Harvard Medical School faculty
State University of New York faculty
Living people
Year of birth missing (living people)